Hyblaea flavifasciata is a moth in the family Hyblaeidae described by George Hampson in 1910.

References

Hyblaeidae